"Proof Positive" is a short story by Graham Greene written in 1930 and first published in 1931 as the winner of the first prize (10 Guineas) in a newspaper ghost story competition. .

Publication
The story was collected in Greene's 1947 collection Nineteen Stories.

Inspiration
The story was inspired by Edgar Allan Poe's short story "The Facts in the Case of M. Valdemar" (1845).

Plot
The story concerns a meeting of the 'local Psychical Society' at which guest speaker, Major Weaver, claims to have 'proof positive' that 'the spirit does not die when the body dies'. The Major appears ill and carries a handkerchief with an overpoweringly sweet odor. As he speaks his words become increasingly disjointed until finally it degenerates into an 'odd jangling note' as he collapses back into his chair.  A doctor from the audience rushes onstage, discards the handkerchief and pronounces him dead. As another more unpleasant smell can be detected the doctor whispers "The man must have been dead a week..."

Radio adaptation
The story was dramatized for The Black Mass radio series broadcast on KPFA on June 3, 1964.

References

External links
online text
mp3 audio file of radio play

1930 short stories
Short stories by Graham Greene
Works originally published in Harper's Magazine
1964 radio dramas
Fiction about psychic powers